Crowdy may refer to:

People
Edith Frances Crowdy CBE (1880-1947) was the Deputy Director of the Women's Royal Naval Service.
Joseph Crowdy CB (born 19 November 1923) is a retired English soldier and military doctor, a former Commandant of the Royal Army Medical College
Rachel Crowdy DBE (1884-1964) was an English nurse and social reformer.
William Saunders Crowdy (August 11, 1847 – August 4, 1908) was an American soldier, preacher, entrepreneur, theologian, and pastor

Places
Crowdy Bay National Park is a national park in New South Wales (Australia), 271 km northeast of Sydney
Crowdy Reservoir is located on Bodmin Moor near Camelford in North Cornwall